Leng Tch'e is a Belgian grindcore band. The band describes their style as "razorgrind", a combination of grindcore with death metal, stoner rock and metalcore. The band's name is an alternate romanisation of "língchí", a method of torture and execution originating from Imperial China that is also known as "death by a thousand cuts". Death by a Thousand Cuts is also the name of one of the band's albums.

Biography
Leng Tch'e drummer Sven is Aborted frontman Gurgloroth 'Svencho' Sven De Caluwé. The band began life under the billing of Anal Torture, forged by Sven and Dark Ages guitarist Glen along with vocalist Isaac and bass player Kevin in early 2002. Leng Tch'e signed to the Italian Spew label for the opening 2002 album Death by a Thousand Cuts. After that album, the band released a split 7-inch single with Black Ops.

The band would employ Israeli guitarist Nir 'The Goat' Doliner of Lehavoth, even undertaking gigs in Israel opening for Amon Amarth. Unable to secure a bassist Nicolas would switch from guitar to cover this role. Eventually the distance factor for Doliner prevented a full-time role. In early 2004 therefore the band inducted Geert as second guitarist. The band enrolled former Pyaemia bassist Frank Rizzo as guitarist in late 2003. Meantime, Isaac founded a noise side project billed as Permanent Death whilst vocalist Sven De Caluwé would front In-Quest for an album.

The band's second album, ManMadePredator, was released in May 2003. Leng Tch'e proposed split releases in 2004 with Fuck...I'm Dead for No Escape Records and a split 7-inch single with Gronibard on Bones Brigade Records. Guitarist Rizzo decamped in August, being replaced in November by Jan of Spleen. In early 2005 the band inducted Boris of Suppository as new frontman, debuting this revised line-up at 30 April 'Face Your Underground' festival in Antwerp.

Leng Tch'e contracted to Relapse Records in March, scheduling a summer release date for new album The Process of Elimination. The band played May US East Coast dates along with Impaled, Malignancy and Aborted. The band partnered with Fuck the Facts and Beneath the Massacre for a Canadian tour in 2006.

On March 9, 2007, a new album, Marasmus, was released on Relapse Records. Some commentators noted that the album was closer to the deathcore sound.

On May 16, 2008, The band announced that Boris had decided to quit the band.

A successor was found in Serge Kasongo, formerly of Ackros with whom the band toured Canada in 2008 alongside Krisiun. Recording for the followup to Marasmus started in 2009 with a release planned for the spring of 2010 on new record label Season Of Mist. The album was named Hypomanic and mixed and mastered by Russ Russell (Napalm Death, Brujeria, Evile).

The band toured with Origin and Psycroptic in early 2012 in support of Hypomanic.

Influences
The band's Myspace page credits Regurgitate, Hemdale, Nasum and Blood Duster as formative influences for the group. Jan Hallaert has also cited Hateplow, Bury Your Dead, Burnt by the Sun, Yob, The Sword, Converge, Neurosis, Mastodon, Aborted, Ringworm, Morbid Angel, Hatebreed, Torche, Suffocation, Fu Manchu, and Cephalic Carnage.

Members

Current members
Nicolas Malfeyt - bass (2002–present)
Jan Hallaert - guitars (2005–present)
Serge Kasongo - vocals (2008–present)
Olivier Coppens - drums (2011–present)

Former Members
Kevin Loosveld - bass (2001-2002)
Glen Herman - guitars (2001-2003)
Isaac Roelens - vocals (2001-2005)
Sven de Caluwe - drums, vocals (2001-2007)
Steven Van Cauwenbergh - bass (2003)
Nir Doliner - guitars (2003)
Frank Stijnen - guitars (2003-2004)
Geert Devenster - guitars (2004-2007)
Boris Cornelissen - vocals (2005-2008)
Peter Goemaere - guitars (2007)
Tony van den Eynde - drums (2007-2011)

Timeline

Discography
  Razorgrind  (Split 7-inch EP with Black Ops) (2002)
 Death by a Thousand Cuts (2002)
 ManMadePredator (2003)
 The Process of Elimination (2005)
 Amusical Propaganda for Sociological Warfare (Split 7-inch EP with Warscars) (2006)
 Marasmus (2007)
 Split w/ Fuck the Facts (2008)
 Hypomanic (2010)
  Razorgrind  (2017)

References

External links 
 Official Myspace
 Official Leng Tch'e website
 The Spew Records
 Relapse Records
 Season Of Mist

Belgian grindcore musical groups
Belgian heavy metal musical groups
Musical groups established in 2001
Relapse Records artists
Season of Mist artists